The Putative Acholeplasma Phage L2 Holin (L2 Holin) Family (TC# 1.E.59) consists of a putative holin (TC# 1.E.59.1.1; 81 amino acyl residues (aas) and 2 transmembrane segments (TMSs)) and a homologous uncharacterized protein (TC# 1.E.59.1.2; 75 aas and 2 TMSs). These proteins are of particular interest because they may show a link between prokaryotic holins and eukaryotic virus viroporins. While functionally uncharacterized, this putative holin (TC# 1.E.59.1.1) comes up in BLAST searches when members of viroporin families TC# 1.A.95 and TC# 1.A.100 are used as query sequences.

See also 
 Holin
 Lysin
 Transporter Classification Database

Further reading 
 Nieva, José Luis; Madan, Vanesa; Carrasco, Luis. "Viroporins: structure and biological functions". Nature Reviews Microbiology 10 (8): 563–574. .
 Saier, Milton H.; Reddy, Bhaskara L. (2015-01-01). "Holins in Bacteria, Eukaryotes, and Archaea: Multifunctional Xenologues with Potential Biotechnological and Biomedical Applications". Journal of Bacteriology 197(1): 7–17. . . . .
 Wang, I. N.; Smith, D. L.; Young, R. (2000-01-01). "Holins: the protein clocks of bacteriophage infections". Annual Review of Microbiology 54: 799–825. . . .

References 

Protein families
Membrane proteins
Transmembrane proteins
Transmembrane transporters
Transport proteins
Integral membrane proteins
Holins